Abu Muhamamd Asbat ibn Muhammad al-Qurashi al-Kufi (died ) was a muhaddith from Kufa.

References 

Hadith scholars
Sunni imams
Sunni Muslim scholars of Islam
9th-century Muslim scholars of Islam
Year of birth unknown
810s deaths